Bhedpu  is a village development committee in Dolakha District in the Janakpur Zone of north-eastern Nepal. At the time of the 1991 Nepal census it had a population of 3,943 people living in 767 individual households.

References

External links
UN map of the municipalities of Dolakha District

Populated places in Dolakha District